Rebecca Leigh Goodgame Ebinger (born July 11, 1975) is a United States district judge of the United States District Court for the Southern District of Iowa and former Iowa state judge.

Early life and education

Ebinger received a Bachelor of Science in Foreign Service in 1997 from the Edmund A. Walsh School of Foreign Service at Georgetown University. Before law school, she worked at the Council on Foreign Relations and the Center for Strategic and International Studies. She began law school at William & Mary Law School, where she was first in her class, before transferring to Yale Law School, from which she graduated in 2004. At Yale, she won the Potter Stewart Prize for winning the Morris Tyler Moot Court. She also worked at the United States Attorney's Office for the District of Connecticut and for the Central Intelligence Agency's Office of General Counsel. Ebinger is married to Lou Ebinger, an attorney in Des Moines.

Career
She began her legal career with the United States Attorney's Office for the Northern District of Iowa, serving as a Special Assistant United States Attorney, from 2004 to 2006. From 2006 to 2008, she served as a law clerk to Judge Michael Joseph Melloy of the United States Court of Appeals for the Eighth Circuit. From 2009 to 2011, she served as an Assistant United States Attorney in the Criminal Division of the United States Attorney's Office for the Northern District of Iowa, primarily specializing in white-collar crime. When she worked in Cedar Rapids from 2004 to 2011, she coached the University of Iowa College of Law's moot court team. From 2011 to 2012, she was an Assistant United States Attorney in the Southern District of Iowa and worked in the appellate unit. From 2012 to 2016, she served as a State District Judge in Iowa's Judicial Election District 5C after being appointed by Terry Branstad.

Federal judicial service

On September 15, 2015, President Barack Obama nominated Ebinger to serve as a United States District Judge of the United States District Court for the Southern District of Iowa, to the seat vacated by Judge James E. Gritzner, who assumed senior status on March 1, 2015. She received a hearing before the United States Senate Judiciary Committee on October 21, 2015. On November 5, 2015 her nomination was reported out of committee by voice vote. Ebinger's home state senator, Chuck Grassley, brokered a deal for Ebinger's confirmation by the Senate: in exchange for Democrats' votes for Ebinger and Leonard Terry Strand, the committee would advance three liberal nominees. She was confirmed by the Senate by a 83–0 vote on February 8, 2016. She received her commission on February 16, 2016.

References

External links

1975 births
Living people
21st-century American judges
21st-century American women judges
American women lawyers
American lawyers
Assistant United States Attorneys
Walsh School of Foreign Service alumni
Iowa lawyers
Iowa Republicans
Iowa state court judges
Judges of the United States District Court for the Southern District of Iowa
People from Clearwater, Florida
United States district court judges appointed by Barack Obama
Yale Law School alumni